Melchior is both a given name and a surname.

Melchior may also refer to:

 The Melchior system of taxonomy
 A melchior, a wine bottle holding 18 litres
 Melchior (alloy), an alloy of copper and nickel used to manufacture cutlery
 Melchior, a brand of ale brewed by Picobrouwerij Alvinne, Ingelmunster Belgium
 Melchior Base, an Argentine Antarctic base